The Château de Kolbsheim is located near the town of Kolbsheim,  in the French Department of Bas-Rhin, in Alsace. It is 15 kilometers southwest of Strasbourg, overlooking the plain of Alsace.

The chateau has two wings, the oldest built in 1703. The upper part of the garden is geometric French garden, decorated with ponds, fountains, hedges and sculpted trees. The lower part is an English park, with many hundred-year-old trees.  Much of the garden was destroyed in the First World War, but was restored by the Grunelius family, the present owners. 

The Garden is classified by the French Ministry of Culture as among The Notable Gardens of France.

Gardens in Bas-Rhin
Châteaux in Bas-Rhin